Tegenaria bozhkovi  is a funnel-web spider found in Bulgaria and Greece.

See also 
 List of Agelenidae species

References 

bozhkovi
Spiders of Europe
Spiders described in 2008